Jim Massey is an American humorist, bookmaker, and comic book writer. He is most famous for his work on Death Takes a Holiday, Maintenance and Stephen Colbert's Tek Jansen.

References

External links
Jim Massey interview
Big Things article by Jim Massey
Jim Massey on MySpace

American comics writers
American humorists
Living people
Year of birth missing (living people)